is a retired Japanese professional tennis player. He competed primarily on the ATP Challenger Tour and ITF Futures Tour, both in singles and doubles. He reached his highest ATP singles ranking of World No. 661 on October 20, 2014, and his highest ATP doubles ranking of World No. 304 on June 9, 2014.

Career
During his tenure playing professional tennis, Sato only played in 2 ATP Tour - level matches. Both of these matches came in doubles at the 2012 World Team Cup tournament where he represented Japan. Partnering with Tatsuma Ito, the pair first lost during their matchup against Argentina to  Juan Ignacio Chela and Juan Pablo Brzezicki 7–6(7–3), 1–6, [7–10] and then lost during their matchup against USA to James Blake and Ryan Harrison 6–4, 0–6, [3–10].

Sato reached 27 career doubles finals, winning 12 and falling in 15. Of those finals, he appeared just once at the ATP Challenger Tour level, at the 2014 Toyota Challenger in Toyota Japan, where he and partner Yang Tsung-hua of Taiwan lost to Japanese duo Toshihide Matsui / Yasutaka Uchiyama in straight sets 6–7(6-8), 2-6.

His last tournament was the Korea F8 ITF Futures, Anseong in September 2016  where he lost in the third round of qualifying in singles, and lost in the first round of doubles to end his professional tennis career.

He is married to retired Japanese WTA tennis player Maiko Inoue.

ATP Challenger and ITF Futures finals

Doubles: 27 (12–15)

References

External links

1985 births
Living people
Japanese male tennis players
20th-century Japanese people
21st-century Japanese people